The 2021 Nepal Census was the twelfth nationwide census of Nepal conducted by the Central Bureau of Statistics. The census was originally scheduled from 8 June to 22 June 2021, but was postponed to November 2021 due to surge in COVID-19 cases.

Background

Planning

Questionnaire

Results 
Total population: 29,192,480

Population of Province 1

Population of Madhesh Province

Population of Bagmati Province

Population of Gandaki Province

Population of Lumbini Province

Population of Karnali Province

Population of Sudurpaschim Province

Controversies
The enumerators of the census have been alleged to use pencil while filling out the forms, instead of ink pen.

The Kayat community of Baglung declared boycotting from the census.  The Nepal Federation of Indigenous Nationalities issued a statement alleging the census enumerators not asking the questions on language and religion. The federation has alleged enumerators of filling the form without asking these questions. The enumerators have also been alleged for noting second language as "Nepali", without asking the person. An enumerator was captured by the locals in Lamjung alleging that they noted their religion as Hindu, despite informing them that they are Buddhists.

The Wambule community expressed its concern over census enumeration form having their language mentioned as "Yambule". Rai organizations also drew attention of the authorities citing that there is a Rai ethnicity, but no Rai language and that Rai people speak 26 languages which census enumeration form has incorrectly listed.

People of Nisikhola Rural Municipality demanded to re-take the census after enumerators noted information in their notebooks instead of the official enumeration form. The deputy house speaker of Bagmati Province Assembly alleged census enumerators not even asking basic questions. She also alleged that census enumerators enlisted her second language as 'Nepali', when told them to write down 'Gurung'. She also demanded that the census should be conducted by local government.

It has also been reported that census enumerators were chased away in Saptari, Siraha and Dhanusha of Province No. 2. Many people from the Dalit community reported of having to lie about their caste due to the fear of eviction by the landlords.

See also
 Census in Nepal

References

External links
 Central Bureau of Statistics
 National Census 2021

Censuses in Nepal
Nepal
2021 in Nepal
November 2021 events in Asia